Xylena curvimacula, known generally as the swordgrass moth or dot-and-dash swordgrass moth, is a species of cutworm or dart moth in the family Noctuidae. It is found in North America.

The MONA or Hodges number for Xylena curvimacula is 9874.

References

Further reading

 
 
 

Xylenini
Articles created by Qbugbot
Moths described in 1874